The following are lists of members of parliament in Singapore:

 1st Parliament of Singapore#Members, 1965
 2nd Parliament of Singapore#Members, 1968
 3rd Parliament of Singapore#Members, 1972
 4th Parliament of Singapore#Members, 1977
 5th Parliament of Singapore#Members, 1981
 6th Parliament of Singapore#Members, 1985
 7th Parliament of Singapore#Members, 1989
 8th Parliament of Singapore#Members, 1992
 9th Parliament of Singapore#Members, 1997
 10th Parliament of Singapore, 2002
 11th Parliament of Singapore, 2006
 List of members of the 12th Parliament of Singapore, 2011
 List of members of the 13th Parliament of Singapore, 2016
 14th Parliament of Singapore, 2020
 2020 Singaporean general election

See also
 Parliament of Singapore
 Speaker of the Parliament of Singapore
 Nominated Member of Parliament
 Non-constituency Member of Parliament
 Elections in Singapore
 Constitution of Singapore

Lists of politicians lists
Parliament of Singapore